Score: A Film Music Documentary is a 2016 American documentary film directed by Matt Schrader about film scores, featuring Hans Zimmer, Danny Elfman, John Williams, Quincy Jones, Rachel Portman, Trent Reznor, and others. The film was released theatrically by Gravitas Ventures on June 16, 2017, and on Blu-ray and download September 5, 2017.

The film inspired Score: The Podcast, a weekly show on Apple Podcasts hosted by the producers and featuring prominent Hollywood composers as guests, which launched April 3, 2018.

Cast 
Schrader and the filmmakers interviewed more than 60 composers, directors, orchestrators, agents, executives and experts for the documentary. Schrader says he started with the idea of having only three composers featured, but realized the diversity of musical opinions present in the film composing world.

Film composers

 Hans Zimmer
 Danny Elfman
 John Williams
 Quincy Jones
 Rachel Portman
 Trent Reznor
 Steve Jablonsky
 Brian Tyler
 Bear McCreary
 John Debney
 Joe Kraemer
 Marco Beltrami
 Howard Shore
 Alexandre Desplat
 Harry Gregson-Williams
 Thomas Newman
 Patrick Doyle
 Atticus Ross
 John Powell
 Mark Mothersbaugh
 Dario Marianelli
 Trevor Rabin
 Henry Jackman
 Jerry Goldsmith
 Max Richter
 Christophe Beck
 Tyler Bates
 David Arnold
 Christopher Young
 Ennio Morricone
 David Newman
 Heitor Pereira
 Mychael Danna
 Elliot Goldenthal
 Bernard Herrmann
 Conrad Pope
 Alfred Newman
 Joseph Trapanese
 Max Steiner
 Mervyn Warren
 Christopher Lennertz
 Deborah Lurie
 J. Ralph
 Buck Sanders
 John Barry
 J.A.C. Redford
 Alex North
 Junkie XL

Directors

 James Cameron
 Garry Marshall
 Steven Spielberg
 Christopher Nolan
 George Lucas

Other cast

 Leonard Maltin
 Jon Burlingame
 Robert Kraft
 Moby
 Siu-Lan Tan
 Amos Newman
 Robert Townson
 Mitchell Leib
 Paul Broucek
 Doreen Ringer Ross
 Shawn LeMone

Production

In 2014, director Schrader left his career as an investigative journalist for CBS News to pursue a feature documentary about film composers. Bankrolling budget camera lenses and editing equipment from his own savings, Schrader recruited friends to join his team, including producers Trevor Thompson, Jonathan Willbanks and Nate Gold, and former KOVR-TV news photographer, Kenny Holmes.

In February 2015, SCORE launched a campaign on the crowdfunding website Kickstarter, which garnered attention and raised $120,930 in 30 days — more than triple the initial goal of $40,000.

Former President of Fox Music Robert Kraft joined after hearing about the project, and by early 2016, Schrader had completed more than 60 interviews with composers, directors, orchestrators, agents and more in the film music industry.

The film was acquired by Gravitas Ventures, which released it in theaters June 2017, earning $101,382 box office in the United States. The film was then released on Blu-ray, DVD and digital in September 2017, and was the #1 iTunes documentary for four consecutive weeks.

The film's website says it is available in other territories including Estonia, Finland, Iceland, Japan, Latvia, Lithuania, Norway, Sweden, Spain, Austria, Australia, Denmark, Germany, Italy, Liechtenstein, Luxembourg, Netherlands, South Korea, Switzerland, United Kingdom and Israel.

Reception

Critical reception
Score received positive reviews from critics. Film review aggregator Rotten Tomatoes reported that 91% of critics gave it a positive review, based on 35 reviews with an average rating of 7.1/10. The website's critical consensus reads, "Score: A Film Music Documentary offers a long-overdue look at an integral component of cinema whose abbreviated overview of the subject should only leave viewers ready for more." On Metacritic, the film has a weighted average score of 67 out of 100, based on 9 critics, indicating "generally favorable reviews".

Gary Goldstein of the Los Angeles Times called the film "a feast for the eyes and ears," while film critic Richard Roeper of the Chicago Sun-Times said Score was "a celebration of the artists who create the musical heartbeat of the movies we love." Critic and historian Leonard Maltin (who appears in the film) said Schrader produced "a cohesive and fascinating film", adding the film "doesn’t miss a beat." The New York Times selected the film as a Critics Pick in June 2017.

Awards 
Score premiered at the Hamptons International Film Festival in October 2016 and won awards at eight film festivals, including the Boulder International Film Festival, Chicago Critics Film Festival, Cleveland International Film Festival, Gasparilla International Film Festival, Nashville Film Festival, Newport Beach Film Festival, Sedona Film Festival and Tacoma Film Festival. It was also an official selection to the 2017 San Francisco International Film Festival. In October 2017, the film was nominated for the Hollywood Music in Media Awards in the Music Documentary category.

Score was named Best Documentary at the 2017 Chicago Critics Film Festival.

References

External links 
 
 
 
 
 

2016 films
2016 documentary films
American documentary films
Documentary films about the music industry
2010s English-language films
2010s American films